Eastcott may refer to two places in England:

 Eastcott, Cornwall, a hamlet
 Eastcott, Wiltshire, a hamlet

See also 

 Ascot (disambiguation)
 Eastcote (disambiguation)
 Eastcotts, Bedfordshire